Elaealis is a monotypic snout moth genus. Its single species, Elaealis olivalis, is found in eastern Africa including Uganda. Both the genus and species were described by George Hampson in 1906.

References

Pyralinae
Monotypic moth genera
Moths of Africa
Pyralidae genera